The North Dakota Wing of the Civil Air Patrol (CAP) is the highest echelon of Civil Air Patrol in the state of North Dakota. North Dakota Wing headquarters are located in Bismarck, North Dakota. The North Dakota Wing consists of over 200 cadet and adult members at over 7 locations across the state of North Dakota.

Mission
The North Dakota Wing performs the three primary missions of the Civil Air Patrol: providing emergency services; offering cadet programs for youth; and providing aerospace education for both CAP members and the general public.

Emergency services
The Civil Air Patrol performs emergency services during emergencies through various missions, including: search and rescue; disaster relief; humanitarian services, and counter-drug operations.

In March 2009, the North Dakota Wing was deployed to respond to flooding along the Red River of the North. Civil Air Patrol ground teams assisted
local residents with sandbagging efforts, and erected a dike around a Red Cross building in the path of the flooding. Five aircraft from the North Dakota Wing, along with two aircraft from the South Dakota Wing, made 134 flights to conduct aerial photography missions to survey damage for the state's Emergency Operations Center.

Cadet programs
The Civil Air Patrol runs a cadet program for the purpose of enhancing the leadership skills of cadets through cultivating an interest in aviation, and also for providing services to the United States Air Force, and the local community.

Aerospace education
The Civil Air Patrol runs both internal and external aerospace education programs. The internal program provides aerospace education to the CAP membership, both senior and cadet. The external program provides the general public with aerospace education.

Organization

Legal protection
Employers within the borders of North Dakota may not terminate or demote an employee who is a member of the Civil Air Patrol if that employee takes a leave of absence in order to respond to an emergency mission as a part of the Civil Air Patrol. Nor may an employer discriminate during the hiring process or otherwise deny employment to an individual based on his or her affiliation with the Civil Air Patrol.

See also
North Dakota Air National Guard
State defense force

References

External links
North Dakota Wing Civil Air Patrol official website

Wings of the Civil Air Patrol
Education in North Dakota
Military in North Dakota